The Qiemo River, also called the Cherchen or Qarqan River, runs across the Tarim Basin in the Xinjiang Uyghur Autonomous Region. It feeds into the Lop Nor salty marshes.

Historical maps

Notes

References

See also 

 Qiemo County
 Qiemo Town
 Tatrang

Rivers of Xinjiang